Antoñana is a town located in the Campezo/Kanpezu municipality, Álava (Araba) Province, in the Basque Country autonomous community, northern Spain.

See also
Apellániz

External links

 ANTOÑANA in the Bernardo Estornés Lasa - Auñamendi Encyclopedia (Euskomedia Fundazioa) 

Populated places in Álava